Omugwo is a 2017 Nigerian comedic movie written by Kemi Adesoye and directed by Kunle Afolayan under the production studio of Golden Effects Pictures in partnership with African Magic Films. Kunle Afolayan who is known for his whodunit movies diverted to provide the audience with comic relief. The comedic movie is one of the three movies by commissioned by African Magic Films to be produced in collaboration with him. The movie though, comical,  addresses the vital issue in the African settings; motherhood.  It prioritises  the African traditional rites in motherhood and it stars actors and actresses such as  Ayo Adesanya, Patience Ozokwor, Omowunmi Dada and Ken Erics.

Synopsis 
The movie follows the story of a young couple, a civil engineer and an Online Radio Personality.  After the delivery of their child, the duo's mother moved in to take care of the newly delivered mother in respect to the Igbo culture called Omugwo. The movie took a comic and dramatic when the household had to battle with the different cultural background of the two mothers and Postpartum depression of the wife

Premiere 
The movie was privately screened  Silverbird Galleria, Victoria Island, Lagos prior to his release in Cinemas across the country. The screening was attended by celebrities and notable personalities in the movie industry such as Africa Magic, Silverbird Distribution companies stakeholders. Founder/CEO of Africa International Film Festival (AFRIFF), Ms. Chioma Ude, Mahmood Ali-Balogun, Chris Ekejimbe, 

Kate Henshaw, Mr. Seun Shoyinka, Yomi Fash-Lanso and Funsho Adeolu

Cast
 Ken Erics 
 Omowunmi Dada
 Patience Ozokwor
 Ayo Adesanya

References

Nigerian comedy films
English-language Nigerian films
2017 films